Abbots Creek is a tributary of Back Creek in Cumberland County, New Jersey in the United States.

See also
List of rivers of New Jersey

References

Rivers of Cumberland County, New Jersey
Rivers of New Jersey
Tributaries of Delaware Bay